The 2008–09 Ukrainian Second League was the 18th season of 3rd level professional football in Ukraine. The competitions are divided into two groups – A and B.

Competition information 
Note: Relegation from the League is not covered by the current regulations.
The placing of teams in the table is done in the following order:
 number of accumulated points
 number of wins
 difference(GD) between goals for(GF) and goals allowed(GA)
 number of goals for
 The League Fair-play ranking
The next tie-break is a simple draw.

Team changes

Admitted teams 
The following teams were promoted from the 2008 Ukrainian Football Amateur League:
 FC Bastion Illichivsk – first group stage participant (debut)
 FC Desna-2 Chernihiv – first group stage participant (debut)
 FC Dnipro-75 Dnipropetrovsk – first group stage participant (debut)

Also, two more reserve teams were admitted:
 FC Knyazha-2 Schaslyve – (debut)
 PFC Sevastopol-2 – (debut)

Also, one team was re-admitted:
 MFC Mykolaiv was admitted to the Second League in expense of FC Dynamo-3 Kyiv.

Relegated teams 
The following teams were relegated from the 2007–08 Ukrainian First League:
 MFC Mykolaiv – 10th place (returning after an absence of two seasons)
 FC Dnipro Cherkasy – 18th place (returning after an absence of two seasons)
 FC CSKA Kyiv – 19th place (returning after an absence of 12 seasons)
 Originally promoted to the First League as a second team of FC CSKA-Borysfen Kyiv.
 FC Stal Dniprodzerzhynsk – 20th place (returning after an absence of four seasons)

Renamed teams 
 A teams swap de facto took place when FC Olimpik Kirovohrad was renamed into FC Zirka Kirovohrad and reorganized. Previously in 2007 both Olimpik and Zirka played in the Amateur League. Following reorganization Olimpik continued its participation at amateur level, while Zirka started to play at professional level.
 Nyva-Svitanok Vinnytsia renamed themselves prior to the start of the season to Nyva Vinnytsia.
 FC Podillya-Khmelnytskyi Khmelnytskyi renamed themselves to Dynamo Khmelnytskyi on March 2, 2009 (during the season).
 FC Yavir Krasnopillya changed their name to FC Sumy on September 11, 2008 (during the season).

Withdrawn (expelled) teams 
 FC Dynamo-3 Kyiv withdrew out of courtesy before the start of the season to allow MFK Mykolaiv to enter the competition.
 FC Khimik Krasnoperekopsk did not submit a license for the season and withdrew from the PFL.
 FC Enerhiya Yuzhnoukrainsk withdrew from the PFL before the start of the season citing financial difficulties.
 FC Desna-2 Chernihiv did not arrive On October 25, 2008 for the match against their opponent FC Knjazha-2 Schaslyve and subsequently withdrew from the PFL on October 29, 2008.
 FC Obolon-2 Kyiv withdrew after the winter-break.
 FC Knyazha-2 Shchaslyve withdrew after the winter-break.
 PFC Sevastopol-2 withdrew after the winter-break.
 FC Korosten was expelled from the PFL after the 22nd round for not arriving to a scheduled game for the second time in the 2008–09 season.
 FC Dnipro Cherkasy was expelled from the competition after the 28th round.

Group A

Location map

Standings

Withdrawn teams

Desna-2 Chernihiv 
On October 25, 2008 FC Desna-2 Chernihiv did not arrive for the match against their opponent FC Knjazha-2 Schaslyve and subsequently withdrew from the PFL on October 29, 2008. The PFL annulled all their results from the competition and adjusted the standings.
Desna-2 Chernihiv had a record of 2 wins, 1 draw and 12 losses scoring 7 goals and having 24 goals scored against them.

Obolon-2 Kyiv 
Obolon-2 withdrew after the winter-break.
Obolon-2 Kyiv after 20 games had a record of 5 wins, 4 draws and 11 losses scoring 20 goals and having 31 goals scored against them and were in 16th place in the standings.

Knyazha-2 Schaslyve 
Knyazha-2 withdrew after the winter-break.
FC Knjazha-2 Schaslyve after 20 games had a record of 4 wins, 2 draws and 14 losses scoring 15 goals and having 35 goals scored against them and were in 17th place in the standings.

Nafkom Brovary 
Nafkom withdrew after the season completed failing to receive a professional license. Most of its players joined Nyva Vinnytsia.

Expelled teams

FC Korosten 
FC Korosten was expelled from the PFL after the 22nd round for not arriving to a scheduled game for the second time in the 2008–09 season.
FC Korosten after 21 games had a record of 8 wins, 2 draws and 11 losses scoring 24 goals and having 36 goals scored against them and were in 11th place in the standings.

Dnipro Cherkasy 
Dnipro were expelled from the competition after the 28th round. The club failed to arrive for their 29th and 30th-round games.
Dnipro Cherkasy after 27 games had a record of 17 wins, 5 draws and 5 losses scoring 37 goals and having 14 scored against them and were in 3rd place in the standings.

Top goalscorers 

  Ilyuk signed with Premier League club Shakhtar Donetsk (December 12, 2008)
  Kozban signed with Nafkom after Knjazha-2 withdrew from the competition and he was granted free agent status from the PFL
  Tovkatsky signed with Arsenal Bila Tserkva after the winter break

Group B

Location map

Standings

Withdrawn teams

PFC Sevastopol-2 Sevastopol 
PFC Sevastopol-2 withdrew after the winter-break.
PFC Sevastopol-2 Sevastopol after 21 games had a record of 2 wins, 4 draws and 15 losses scoring 17 goals and having 39 goals scored against them and were in 17th place in the standings.

Arsenal Kharkiv 
Arsenal withdrew after the season completed failing to receive a professional license.

Tytan Donetsk 
Tytan failed to pay license fees for the next season and subsequently the PFL withdrew their professional status in the league.

Top goalscorers 

  Berezhny signed with Stal' during the winter break
  Melnyk promoted to the main squad of FC Illichivets Mariupol after the winter break
  Dudchenko signed with Premier League club Dynamo Kyiv (January 9, 2009)

Playoff game 
Due to FC Ihroservice Simferopol failing to pay their license dues for the 2009–10 Ukrainian First League season the PFL allowed an extra team to be promoted.
The PFL determined that a playoff game between the 2nd placed teams Druha Liha –
Arsenal Bila Tserkva and FC Poltava.

Playoff game to determine promotion

Stadia 

Notes:
  CMS stands for Central Municipal Stadium, the name of a stadium that doesn't carry any official names, and followed by the city's name where the stadium is located. Usually such stadiums are the property of the city with a generic name "Tsentralnyi" (Central, in Ukrainian)
  SC stands for Sport Complex abbreviation
  OOM stands for Oleh Oleksenko Memorial

See also 
 2008–09 Ukrainian Premier League
 2008–09 Ukrainian First League
 2008–09 Ukrainian Cup

References 

Ukrainian Second League seasons
3
Ukra